Sivas Torbati, better known by the mononym Sivas stylized as xx5!V45xx, is a Danish rapper of Iranian origin. He is signed to Sony Music.<ref name=politiken>[http://politiken.dk/ibyen/ibyenprisen/ECE2297589/svas-vinder-ibyen-prisen-som-aarets-upcoming/ Politiken: S!vas vinder IBYEN-prisen som Årets Upcoming] </ref>

He resided in Brøndby Strand famous for a number of rap and hip hop acts in Denmark.Euroman.dk: S!VAS: "Mit sprog er en slags omvendt integration"  He later moved to Smørum near Tingbjerg and finally Copenhagen. His debut EP was d.a.u.d.a.'' released on Forbandet Ungdom, a sub-label of Disco:wax, and distributed by Sony.

Discography

Albums

EPs

Singles

Featured in

References

Danish rappers
Danish people of Iranian descent
Living people
Year of birth missing (living people)
People from Brøndby Municipality